The Gestionnaire d'Infrastructure Unifié (Unified Infrastructure Manager), or GIU, was a proposed public-sector organisation in France, which would have taken over the management of rail infrastructure from Réseau Ferré de France and SNCF Infra.

These separate bodies had previously been spun off in an attempt to comply with European laws on rail liberalisation, but were not fully independent, and SNCF continued to have a monopoly. They have also accumulated huge debts; RFF alone owes €32 billion. In October 2012, Frédéric Cuvillier, the French Minister for Transport, announced plans to combine rail infrastructure into a single organisation, Gestionnaire d'Infrastructure Unifié. Legislation is being discussed, and is expected to take effect at the start of 2015.

External links
 La réforme ferroviaire (French)

References

Railway infrastructure managers
Railway companies of France